Thuringowa is an electorate in the Legislative Assembly of the state of Queensland, Australia.

The division encompasses suburbs of the former City of Thuringowa on the western edge of  Townsville in North Queensland, stretching from Deeragun in the north to Kelso in the south. It includes the suburbs of Bushland Beach, Shaw, Thuringowa Central, Rasmussen, Condon and Kirwan.

The Electorate is bordered by the Hinchinbrook (North and West), Burdekin (South), Mundingburra and Townsville (both East) Electorates.

History
The Electoral district of Thuringowa was created relatively recently in 1986, mostly from the western section of the Townsville Electorate.

Thuringowa Electorate was one of eleven State seats held by Pauline Hanson's One Nation Party from 1998, until it was returned to Labor in the 2001 landslide.

In 2004 the one term sitting member, Anita Phillips did not recontest, instead choosing to challenge Peter Lindsay (unsuccessfully) for the Federal Division of Herbert.

Labor's Craig Wallace held the seat from 2004.  In the 2006 election Thuringowa went against the statewide trend of a slight swing against Labor, Mr. Wallace achieved a swing towards Labor of 16.2% primary vote and 9.5% two party preferred.  Immediately after the election he was appointed Parliamentary Secretary for North Queensland, and two months later was promoted to Cabinet as the new Minister for Natural Resources and Water and Minister Assisting the Premier in North Queensland when a Cabinet vacancy was created by the resignation of then Attorney-General Linda Lavarch in late October 2006.

Members for Thuringowa

Election results

References

External links
 

Thuringowa
Townsville